The Reprise Albums (1968–1971) is a four-disc box set by Canadian singer-songwriter Joni Mitchell, that was released on June 25, 2021, by Rhino Records. The set is the sixth overall release and first box set of remastered albums from the Joni Mitchell Archives, a planned series of releases featuring remastered and unreleased material from the singer's archives. Formatted in chronological order, the first volume of the remaster series includes Mitchell's first four albums, all of which were released on Reprise Records: Song to a Seagull (1968), Clouds (1969), Ladies of the Canyon (1970), and Blue (1971).

Background and recording
On September 10, 2020, Rhino Records announced the creation of the Joni Mitchell Archives, a planned years-long effort by Mitchell and her late manager Elliot Roberts to finally release and remaster previously unreleased recordings in Mitchell's archives. The first round of releases featured a box set of previously-unreleased material (Joni Mitchell Archives – Vol. 1: The Early Years (1963–1967)), a condensed version subtitled Highlights, an auxiliary compilation album of the earliest material in the box set (Early Joni – 1963), and a separate release of the live sets featured on the box's last two discs (Live at Canterbury House – 1967). The press release announcing the archive's creation indicated a similar release structure would be followed on a yearly basis, which each release round moving through Mitchell's career in chronological order. However, on April 8, 2021, Rhino announced The Reprise Albums (1968–1971), the first box set of remastered studio albums under the Joni Mitchell Archives banner. The press release indicated that the box set’s release is being timed to celebrate the 50th anniversary of Blues release, as well as to introduce an additional yearly release to the series’ lineup, as all "future releases in the archive series will arrive in a similar manner, with a box set focused on studio albums from a specific era, followed by an official 'Archives' release looking at unreleased audio from the same period." The box set of unreleased material recorded during this time period, Joni Mitchell Archives – Vol. 2: The Reprise Years (1968–1971), was released on November 12, 2021.

Like the cover for Early Joni – 1963, the artwork of The Reprise Albums features a previously never-before-seen self-portrait by Mitchell originally drawn sometime during the period of time from which the set’s releases span. The set also features liner notes by American singer-songwriter Brandi Carlile, who wrote that Mitchell's magnum opus Blue is "the greatest album ever made. Blue didn’t make me a better songwriter. Blue made me a better woman… No matter what we are dealing with in these times we can rejoice and know that of all the ages we could have lived through, we lived in the time of Joni Mitchell.” Song to a Seagull features a new mix by Mitchell and audio mixer Matt Lee, as she was compelled to "fix" the album's original mix that sounded to her like "it was recorded under a jello bowl." The poor-sounding quality of the original mix has been attributed to album producer David Crosby's unconventional recording setup that captured an excessive amount of ambient noise.

Track listing
All tracks are written by Joni Mitchell.

Disc 1 – Song to a Seagull (1968)

Disc 2 – Clouds (1969)

Disc 3 – Ladies of the Canyon (1970)

Disc 4 – Blue (1971)

Charts

References

Joni Mitchell albums
2021 albums